5,N-Dimethyl-N-isopropyltryptamine (5-Me-MiPT) is a tryptamine derivative that is thought to be a psychedelic drug. It was first made in 1989. In vitro binding experiments on brain homogenates showed it to have serotonin receptor binding affinity between that of MiPT and 5-MeO-MiPT, both of which are known to be active psychedelics in humans.

References 

 

Psychedelic tryptamines